Datiscoside is any one of several chemical compounds isolated from certain plants, notably Datisca glomerata.  They can be seen as derivatives of the triterpene hydrocarbon cucurbitane, more specifically from cucurbitacin F.

They include:
 Datiscoside B, from D. glomerata 
 Datiscoside D, from D. glomerata 
 Datiscoside H, from D. glomerata

References 

Triterpene glycosides